Stomatella modesta is a species of sea snail, a marine gastropod mollusk in the family Trochidae, the top snails.

Description
The height of the shell attains 2 mm, its diameter 4 mm. The fragile, thin shell has an orbiculate-conoid shape and is much depressed. It is imperforate and is transversely minutely striate-costulate. Its color is whitish painted with irregular chestnut spots. The spire is obtuse and contains four convex whorls, separated by impressed sutures. The first whorl is narrow and slowly increasing. The body whorl is large, rather convex above, and rounded beneath. The large aperture is very oblique and subrotund. The acute peristome is interrupted. The columellar margin is a little reflexed at the insertion. The throat is a little pearly.

Distribution
This marine species occurs in the Red Sea.

References

 Zuschin, M., Janssen, R. & Baal, C. (2009). Gastropods and their habitats from the northern Red Sea (Egypt: Safaga). Part 1: Patellogastropoda, Vetigastropoda and Cycloneritimorpha. Annalen des Naturhistorischen Museums in Wien 111[A]: 73–158.

External links
 dams, H. & Adams, A. (1864). Descriptions of new species of shells, chiefly from the Cumingian collection. Proceedings of the Zoological Society of London. 1863: 428-435
  Issel, A. (1869). Malacologia del Mar Rosso. Ricerche zoologiche e paleontologiche. Biblioteca Malacologica, Pisa. xi + 387 pp., pls 1-5.
 Adams, H. (1872). Further descriptions of new species of shells collected by Robert M'Andrew, Esq., in the Red Sea. Proceedings of the Zoological Society of London. 1872: 9-12, pl. 3
  Hoenselaar H.J. & Dekker H. (1998). Molluscs of the Great Bitter Lake, Suez Canal, Egypt, collected by C. Beets in 1950. Basteria. 62(5/6): 197-214

modesta
Gastropods described in 1864